Lady Hamilton is a 1921 German silent historical film directed by Richard Oswald and starring Liane Haid, Conrad Veidt and Werner Krauss. The film depicts the love affair between the British Admiral Lord Nelson and Lady Emma Hamilton. It was based on two novels by Heinrich Vollrath Schumacher. A copy of the film exists in a Russian film archive.

The film's sets were designed by the art directors Hans Dreier and Paul Leni. Location shooting took place in Hamburg, London, Naples, Rome and Venice.

Cast

References

Bibliography

External links

1921 films
1920s biographical films
1920s historical romance films
German biographical films
German historical romance films
German epic films
Films of the Weimar Republic
German silent feature films
Films directed by Richard Oswald
Films set in Naples
Films set in England
Films set in London
Films shot in London
Films based on German novels
Films based on multiple works
Films set in the 1790s
Films set in the 1800s
German black-and-white films
Cultural depictions of Horatio Nelson
Cultural depictions of Emma, Lady Hamilton
Cultural depictions of George IV
National Film films
Silent adventure films
1920s German films
1920s German-language films
Silent historical romance films